The McNutt School is a historic building located near Boyce, Louisiana. The small ( wood frame one–room schoolhouse is located on a hilltop in the community of McNutt in Rapides Parish. Built in 1910 it was added to the National Register of Historic Places on September 26, 1997.

See also
 Historic preservation
 History of education in the United States
 National Register of Historic Places listings in Rapides Parish, Louisiana

References

External links 
 * 
 

One-room schoolhouses in Louisiana
School buildings on the National Register of Historic Places in Louisiana
Buildings and structures in Rapides Parish, Louisiana
National Register of Historic Places in Rapides Parish, Louisiana